Jonas Häggbom (born 29 July 1960) is a Swedish sailor. He competed in the men's 470 event at the 1988 Summer Olympics.

References

External links
 

1960 births
Living people
Swedish male sailors (sport)
Olympic sailors of Sweden
Sailors at the 1988 Summer Olympics – 470
People from Sollentuna Municipality
Sportspeople from Stockholm County